The European Mixed Curling Championship was a mixed curling tournament held annually in the autumn for European nations. The first tournament was held in 2005.

The European Mixed Curling Championship was replaced with a World Mixed Curling Championship, effective in the 2015–16 curling season.

Results
The results are listed as follows:

All-time Medal Table
The all-time medal table is up-to-date as of the conclusion of the 2014 European Mixed Curling Championship.

References

External links

 
International curling competitions
Curling
Curling in Europe